Escadron de Transformation Mirage 4/3 Argonne is a French Air and Space Force (Armée de l'air et de l'espace) Squadron located at BA 133 Nancy – Ochey Air Base, Meurthe-et-Moselle, France which operates the Dassault Mirage 2000D.

See also

 List of French Air and Space Force aircraft squadrons

References

French Air and Space Force squadrons